Nice to Be with You is the debut album by Gallery, released in 1972 on Sussex Records.

The album peaked at #75 on the Billboard 200, making it the band's only album to chart. Three of its singles entered the Top 40 on both the Hot 100 and Adult Contemporary charts, with the song of the same name as the band's biggest hit.

Track listing

Personnel
Gallery
Jim Gold – lead vocals, guitar
Danny Brucato – drums
Brent Anderson – backing vocals, guitar
Dennis Kovarik – bass, backing vocals
Bill Nova – backing vocals, guitar, percussion
Cal Freeman - guitar
 Paul Franklin - Steel Guitar

Production
Producer: Dennis Coffey, Mike Theodore
Engineer: Milan Bogden
Photography: Ransier & Anderson

Charts
Album

Singles

References

External links

1972 albums
Sussex Records albums
1972 debut albums